Uzundere is a town and district of Erzurum Province in the Eastern Anatolia region of Turkey. The mayor is Muhammet Halis Özsoy (AKP). The population is 3,096 (as of 2010).

Visitor attraction

Oshki, a historic Georgian Orthodox monastery from the second half of the 10th century.

References

Populated places in Erzurum Province
Districts of Erzurum Province
Towns in Turkey
Cittaslow